Serine-rich single pass membrane protein 1 is a protein that in humans is encoded by the SSMEM1 gene.

Gene
The gene and intron-exon structure were first predicted through analysis of the complete sequence of human chromosome 7, its initial designation being C7orf45.  Human mRNA transcripts were identified through two large scale cDNA cloning efforts, an American effort run out of the Dana-Farber Cancer Institute and Harvard Medical School, and full-length long Japan effort.   Later assigned the official symbol SSMEM1, the gene is located on the long arm of chromosome 7 (7q32.2) on the sense strand in humans. The human mRNA transcript is 1171 bp long with three exons.

Aliases
In humans, SSMEM1 is also referred to as C7orf45. Human SSMEM1 has a clone name of FLJ40316.

Expression
In humans, SSMEM1 is highly expressed in the testes. In mice, SSMEM1 is expressed in the brain.

Protein
In humans, serine-rich single pass membrane protein 1 is 244 amino acids long with a transmembrane domain region spanning amino acids 35-55. This protein has a domain of unknown function (DUF4636) that spans almost all of the protein (amino acids 1-243).  DUF4636 belongs to  pfam15468 which is a part of the superfamily cl21285 that is found in eukaryotes and typically 196 to 244 amino acids long. The human protein has a molecular weight of 28036 Da and an isoelectric point of 7.64.

References

Human proteins